The Guizhou salamander (Pseudohynobius guizhouensis) is a species of salamander in the family Hynobiidae. This recently described species is so far known only from its type locality, Yanxia Village (altitude 1,650 m) in Guiding County in Guizhou; it is endemic to China. Adult salamanders measure  in total length.

The original species description relied on morphological characteristics only. Genetic methods, however, have confirmed the Guizhou salamander is a valid species. According to the original description, it is most similar to the Kuankuoshui salamander and the yellow-spotted salamander (P. kuankuoshuiensis and P. flavomaculatus, respectively); genetic data suggest the Jinfo Mountain salamander (P. jinfo) to be its close relative too.

References

Further reading

Pseudohynobius
Amphibians of China
Endemic fauna of China
Amphibians described in 2010